TDP or tdp may refer to:

Computing
 Thermal design power, a value describing the thermal limits of a computer system
 Transparent Distributed Processing, network distributed architecture in the QNX operating system

Politics
Telugu Desam Party, a regional political party in the South Indian states of Telangana and Andhra Pradesh
Territoires de progrès, a political movement in France
Socialist Democratic Party (Turkey), a former political party
Communal Democracy Party, a political party in Northern Cyprus
Democratic Party of Turks, a political party in Macedonia

Science and medicine
TDaP, tetanus, diphtheria and pertussis vaccine
Thermal depolymerization, a process for converting biomass into oil
Thymidine diphosphate, a nucleotide
Thiamine pyrophosphate (thiamine diphosphate), an enzyme cofactor
Torsades de pointes, a form of cardiac arrhythmia
One or more isoforms of TARDBP, a TAR DNA-binding protein

Other uses
Tour de Pologne (TdP), annual men's multiple-stage bicycle race held in Poland
Thames Discovery Programme, a community archaeology project, focusing on the tidal Thames
Trans-Dimensional Police, a fictional agency from the comic book Grimjack
Teledeporte, a Spanish TV sports channel